Lausanne-Gare is a Lausanne Métro station on M2 line. It was opened on 27 October 2008 as part of the inaugural section of the line, from Croisettes to Ouchy–Olympique. The station is located between Lausanne-Flon and Grancy. The station is located in Lausanne railway station, hence the name.

In 1877, a funicular between Lausanne and Ouchy was opened. In 1879, a funicular from Lausanne railway station uphill to Lausanne-Flon was opened as well. It functioned until 1959, when funicular was rebuilt as a rack railway. In 2003, the whole section between Lausanne-Flon and Ouchy was demolished to give way for construction of M2 line.

References

Lausanne Metro stations
Railway stations in Switzerland opened in 2008